Noble Consort Wenxi (died 19 December 1694), of the Manchu Bordered Yellow Banner Niohuru clan, was a consort of the Kangxi Emperor.

Life
Noble Consort Wenxi's personal name was not recorded in history.

Family background
Noble Consort Wenxi's family was prestigious when compared to the maternal families of other sons of the Kangxi Emperor, apart from Crown Prince Yinreng. Her paternal grandmother, Princess Mukushen, was Nurhaci's daughter, which would make the Kangxi Emperor and Noble Consort Wenxi second cousins. When she died in 1694, her younger brother, Alingga, represented her family in mourning.

 Father: Ebilun (d. 1673), served as one of the Four Regents of the Kangxi Emperor, and held the title of a first class duke
 Paternal grandfather: Eidu (1562–1621)
 Paternal grandmother: Aisin Gioro Mukushen (1595–1659), Nurhaci's fourth daughter
 Mother: Lady Šušu Gioro, a concubine
 Seven brothers 
 First Elder brother: Sailin (塞林 三等侍卫), Third Class Imperial Guard
 Second Elder Brother : Unnamed
 Third younger Brother: Faka (法喀 ;17 May 1664– 9 February 1713), First Class Duke (一等公)
 Fourth Younger Brother: Yanzhu (颜珠 一等侍卫;b. 1665), First Class Imperial Guard
 Fifth Younger Brother: Fubao (富保 任二等侍卫;b.1678),Second Class Imperial Guard
 Sixth Younget Brother: Yinde, First Class Duke (尹德 一等公)
 Seventh Younger Brother: Alingga (1670–1716)
 Two elder sisters and three younger sisters
 First elder sister: Princess Consort of the Second Rank of Barin, wife of Zhashen (扎什)
 Second elder sister: Empress Xiaozhaoren (1653 – 18 March 1678) 
 Fourth younger sister: State duchess of the fourth rank, wife of Yunsheng (云升)
 Fifth younger sister: First class viscountess, wife of Ayushen (阿玉什) from Bordered White Banner

Kangxi era
It is not known when Lady Niohuru entered the Forbidden City and became a mistress of the Kangxi Emperor. She was first mentioned in official histories on 28 January 1682 when the Kangxi Emperor granted ranks and titles to his consorts. She was granted the title "Noble Consort". As she was the only one among the emperor's consorts to hold that rank, she did not receive a title to distinguish her from the other consorts.

She gave birth on 28 November 1683 to the emperor's tenth son, Yun'e, and on 24 October 1685 to his 11th daughter, who would die prematurely in June or July 1686.

On 17 December 1694, Lady Niohuru became critically ill. She died two days later and was interred in the Jing Mausoleum of the Eastern Qing tombs. She was granted the title "Noble Consort Wenxi".

Titles
 During the reign of the Shunzhi Emperor (r. 1643–1661) or the Kangxi Emperor (r. 1661–1722):
 Lady Niohuru
 During the reign of the Kangxi Emperor (r. 1661–1722):
 Noble Consort (from 28 January 1682), third rank consort
 Noble Consort Wenxi (from 29 December 1694)

Issue
 As Noble Consort:
 Yun'e (28 November 1683 – 18 October 1741), the Kangxi Emperor's 18th (tenth) son
 The Kangxi Emperor's 11th daughter (24 October 1685 – June/July 1686)

Media
Noble Consort Wenxi is briefly mentioned by Uya Chenbi in the 2011 Chinese television series Legend of Zhen Huan. She was described as a superior woman who obtained the former Emperor's favor in the conversation between Chenbi and Longkodo.

See also
 Ranks of imperial consorts in China#Qing
 Royal and noble ranks of the Qing dynasty

Notes

1694 deaths
Year of birth unknown

Manchu people
17th-century Chinese women
17th-century Chinese people
Consorts of the Kangxi Emperor